Cardinal Mooney High School is a coeducational Catholic high school in Youngstown, Ohio.

History
Cardinal Mooney was founded in 1956 and is run by the Roman Catholic Diocese of Youngstown. In the early 1950s, the Diocese of Youngstown recognized the need to expand Ursuline High School and to build a new parochial high school on the southside. In 1953, Bishop Emmet M. Walsh obtained the present site of Cardinal Mooney High School from the Youngstown Parks Department and began the organization of a high school fundraising committee.

Ground was broken in 1954, and in the fall of 1955 the first freshman class was organized and began attending classes at the old Glenmary convent. Construction of Cardinal Mooney was completed in time for the first day of school in September 1956. A total of 610 students were enrolled as freshmen or sophomores. The school was named after Cardinal Edward Mooney, a former southsider, who was the Archbishop of Detroit. He had distinguished himself as a scholar and Vatican diplomat.

Father William Anthony Hughes, later the Bishop of Covington, Kentucky, was named the school's first principal. Red and Gold were selected as the school colors. They symbolized the blood of the martyrs, and the responsibility of all Christians to accept suffering and the Blessed Sacrament.

The initial faculty included sisters from the Ursuline, Dominican, Notre Dame and Vincentian communities, two priests and five lay teachers.

In June 1959 the first graduating class celebrated Baccalaureate Mass at St. Columba Cathedral, and on June 7 graduation ceremonies were held at Stambaugh Auditorium.

Enrollments grew rapidly in the early '60's. By 1960 an addition to Cardinal Mooney was being planned and an overflow of students were once again attending classes at the old Glenmary Convent. The addition opened in 1961. It included an auditorium, seven classrooms and a physics laboratory.

In early 2000, Cardinal Mooney came into possession of the two military annex buildings adjacent to the school grounds.  Shortly after obtaining this real estate, construction of the high school's new sports complex was underway. Completed in late 2001, the Cardinal Mooney sports complex yields a well rounded athletic training facility where official OHSAA athletic contests can be hosted.  The complex includes a regulation football field, two adjacent practice fields, two tennis courts, a practice putting green, a practice soccer field, two practice baseball fields, a small batting cage, a training pool, and a full-length, rubberized track encircling the main football field.  The U.S. Army and U.S. Navy annex buildings were left standing during construction, but Rush Boulevard was filled in with top soil and cut off from the rear lot.  The buildings, now referred to as the Cardinal Mooney Industrial Arts Center, have since been converted to garages where shop classes can work on vehicles and driving classes can be taught during the summer breaks.

2013 relocation 
On September 3, 2013, Bishop of the Roman Catholic Diocese of Youngstown, George Murry, approved the relocation of the high school from Youngstown's south side to the suburbs of Mahoning County. However, his approval was met with stipulations that included proof of sufficient financial support for both a new high school building as well as an endowment fund to provide scholarships for students who face poverty and other social constraints.

A study released in April 2013 (conducted by Catholic School Management, Inc. in Madison, Connecticut) determined that the school would sustain a better enrollment and for a longer period of time if it relocated.

Bishop Murry originally opposed the move, stating that a large factor in this decision was that it would be cheaper to make renovations than to build a new building. In addition, he said in his statement, it is important for the diocese to be good stewards of their finances. The diocesan superintendent of Catholic schools echoed Murry's original stance and acknowledged the plans that can be put into effect for the future of the school at its present location. The topic has been one of controversy among parents and alumni since discussion of the move began in 2013.

For the 2015 school year, renovations on the current location began, therefore making relocation unlikely. The school has been at its current site on Erie Street since 1956.

Athletics

Ohio High School Athletic Association State Championships 
 Football – 1973, 1980, 1982, 1987, 2004, 2006, 2009, 2011 
 Golf – 1974, 1988, 1989, 2022 
 Soccer – 2002 
 Track – 1988, 1990, 2006, 2008, 2009 
 Cross Country – 1999 
 Gymnastics - 1985, 1986 
 Tennis - 1989

Notable alumni

Football
Tim Beck, former offensive coordinator, Nebraska Cornhuskers football
Jerry Diorio, former NFL offensive guard
Derrell Johnson-Koulianos, former CFL wide receiver
 Ishmaa'ily Kitchen, defensive tackle, New England Patriots
Ed Muransky, retired NFL offensive tackle
Bo Pelini, former head coach, Nebraska Cornhuskers football
Carl Pelini, former head coach, Florida Atlantic Owls football
John Simon, Defensive Line, New England Patriots, Super Bowl Champion
Bob Stoops, former head coach, Oklahoma Sooners football
Mark Stoops, head coach, Kentucky Wildcats football
Mike Stoops, defensive coordinator, Florida Atlantic Owls football

Other
Denise DeBartolo York, billionaire, owner of the San Francisco 49ers
Edward J. DeBartolo Jr., businessman, former owner of the San Francisco 49ers
John Edward "Jed" York, businessman, CEO for the San Francisco 49ers
Mark Malaska, former Major League Baseball relief pitcher
Ray "Boom Boom" Mancini, former lightweight WBA World Champion boxer
Michael J. Moritz Jr., Tony Award Winner, Emmy Award Winner, Broadway producer.
James Traficant, former Congressman for Ohio's 17th congressional district

Notes and references

Roman Catholic Diocese of Youngstown
Education in Youngstown, Ohio
High schools in Mahoning County, Ohio
Catholic secondary schools in Ohio
Educational institutions established in 1956
1956 establishments in Ohio